Corazón salvaje is a Mexican telenovela, which was produced by and broadcast on Televisa in 1977. It is the fourth of five screen adaptations of the novel of the same name by Caridad Bravo Adams, and the second telenovela. The first telenovela starred singer Julissa while the 1977 production starred singer Angélica María who had previously had the role of Mónica in the 1968 film version. Actor Ernesto Alonso produced this version and after not casting Julissa and instead repeating Angélica María the first allegedly declared "Since my father (Luis de Llano) is not employed in this company (Televisa) anymore Ernesto Alonso has forgotten me in his castings".

Cast
 Angélica María as Mónica Molnar
 Martín Cortés as Juan del Diablo
 Susana Dosamantes as Aimee Molnar
 Fernando Allende as Renato D'Autremont
 Bertha Moss as Sofía
 Miguel Manzano as Pedro Noel
 Kikis Herrera Calles as Catalina de Molnar
 Lucy Tovar as Janina
 Socorro Avelar as Ana
 Jorge Vargas as Francisco D'Autremont
 Armando Alcazar as Renato (as a child)
 Ernesto Alonso as Narrator
 Roberto Antunez as Vice-Secretary of the Governor
 Carlos Argüelles as Juan (as a child)
 Consuelo Frank as Sister María Inés de la Conception
 Manuel Guízar as Doctor Alejandro Faber
 Ernesto Marin as Colibrí
 René Muñoz as Esteban
 Agustín Sauret as Marcos
 Raúl Vale as Adrián Lefevre
 Sergio Zuani as Segundo Duclos
 Eduardo Alcaraz as Padre Didier
 Tony Bravo as Charles Brighton
 Rosa Gloria Chagoyán
 Juan Diego Fernandez Viñas
 Roberto Montiel as Gracian
 Leon Singer
 Pilar Souza
 Ignacio Rubiell

See also
 Corazón salvaje

External links
 Corazón salvaje at the telenovela database
 

1977 telenovelas
1970s Mexican television series
1977 Mexican television series debuts
1977 Mexican television series endings
Mexican telenovelas
Spanish-language telenovelas
Televisa telenovelas